The Court of Appeal for Ontario (frequently referred to as the Ontario Court of Appeal or ONCA) is the appellate court for the province of Ontario, Canada. The seat of the court is Osgoode Hall in downtown Toronto, also the seat of the Law Society of Ontario and the Divisional Court of the Ontario Superior Court of Justice.

Description
The Court is composed of 22 judicial seats, in addition to one or more justices who sit supernumerary. They hear over 1,500 appeals each year, on issues of private law, constitutional law, criminal law, administrative law and other matters. The Supreme Court of Canada hears appeals from less than 3% of the decisions of the Court of Appeal for Ontario, therefore in a practical sense, the Court of Appeal is the last avenue of appeal for most litigants in Ontario.

Among the Court of Appeal's most notable decisions was the 2003 ruling in Halpern v Canada (AG) that found defining marriage as between one man and one woman to violate Section 15 of the Canadian Charter of Rights and Freedoms, legalizing same-sex marriage in Ontario and making Canada the first jurisdiction in the world where same-sex marriage was legalized by a court ruling. Among many judges from the Court who have been elevated to the Supreme Court of Canada are Justices Rosalie Abella, Louise Arbour, Peter Cory, Louise Charron, Andromache Karakatsanis, Bora Laskin, Michael Moldaver, and Mahmud Jamal, as well as Bertha Wilson, who was the first female justice on both the Court of Appeal for Ontario (1975) and the Supreme Court of Canada (1982).

The Court of Appeal derives its jurisdiction from Ontario's Courts of Justice Act.

Current judges

Supernumerary Justices

Chief Justices of Ontario

Past judges

Chief Justices of Upper Canada (1792–1841)/Province of Canada (1841–1867)

See also
 Courts of Ontario
 Supreme Court of Canada

Notes

References

External links
 Court of Appeal for Ontario official site
 Ontario Courts website
 Plan to webcast Ontario appeal cases delayed

 
Ontario
Appeal
Lists of Canadian judges
1867 establishments in Ontario
Courts and tribunals established in 1867